Scholar of Decay is a fantasy horror novel by Tanya Huff, set in the world of Ravenloft, and based on the Dungeons & Dragons game.

Plot summary
Scholar of Decay is a novel in which Aurek Nuiken searches in the city of Richemulot for his book of spells.

Reception

Reviews
Kliatt
Review by Michelle West (1996) in The Magazine of Fantasy & Science Fiction, September 1996

References

1995 American novels
Ravenloft novels